Rodrigo Viana Conceição is a Brazilian footballer who plays as a goalkeeper for Novorizontino.

References

External links
 
 

Living people
1989 births
Brazilian footballers
Association football goalkeepers
America Football Club (RJ) players
Duque de Caxias Futebol Clube players
Bonsucesso Futebol Clube players
Tupi Football Club players
Esporte Clube Santo André players
Associação Atlética Caldense players
Sampaio Corrêa Futebol Clube players
Esporte Clube São Bento players
Botafogo Futebol Clube (SP) players
Campeonato Brasileiro Série B players
Campeonato Brasileiro Série C players
Campeonato Brasileiro Série D players
Sportspeople from Niterói